Giorgi Kadagidze (born 10 April 1980) is a Georgian banker.

In 2001 he graduated from the Tbilisi-located European School of Management (ESM). He also received a BA at Preston University. In 2005 he earned MA from the Georgian Institute of Public Affairs. From February 2009 to February 2016 Kadagidze was the chairman and governor of the board of the National Bank of Georgia.

References

External links 
 Official biography National Bank of Georgia

Presidents of the National Bank of Georgia
1980 births
Living people
Businesspeople from Tbilisi